Obesity in China is a major health concern according to the WHO, with overall rates of obesity between 5% and 6% for the country, but greater than 20% in some cities where fast food is popular.

Issues

Since 1954, rapid economic growth has transformed China from a destitute nation to one of largest economies in the world. Malnutrition, previously a persistent problem, has declined from 30% of the population in 1980 to less than 12% in 2014. However, these rapid improvements in living standards have come with rising rates of obesity that threaten to reverse some of the gains in overall health.

These changes are especially pronounced in Chinese cities, where increase caloric intake has combined with increased automation and transport that has reduced daily physical labor for the average citizen. Rapid motorization has drastically reduced levels of cycling and walking in China. Reports in 2002 and 2012 have revealed a direct correlation between ownership of motorized transport by households in China and increasing obesity related problems in children and adults.

Growth in obesity in children has been especially brisk. Between 1985 and 2014, obesity in rural Chinese boys grew from 0.03% to 17.2%, and the obesity rate for girls went from 0.12% to 9.1%. Statistics from the Chinese Health Ministry have revealed that urban Chinese boys age 6 are 2.5 inches taller and 6.6 pounds heavier on average than Chinese city boys 30 years ago. A leading child-health researcher, Ji Chengye, has stated that,  "China has entered the era of obesity. The speed of growth is shocking."

Response and prospects

According to Wang Longde, Chinese Vice Minister of Health, the problem is that the population does not have enough awareness and lacks knowledge of nutrition and what constitutes a reasonable diet. The government is attempting to reduce the problem with building more playgrounds and passing a law which requires students to exercise or play sports for an hour a day at school. Chen Chunming, an expert at the Chinese Center for Disease Control and Prevention has warned against the rapid growth of American fast-food outlets in China saying, "Don't take children to eat fast food like McDonald's and KFC."

De-emphasis on sports also plays an important part in the rise of obesity in China. Many Chinese people believe the way they advance in life is getting a better education so they can get a better job. The emphasis on schoolwork and the pressure to do so much into that direction keeps children away from play and from physical activity.

Fat farms, where overweight children try to lose their excess weight, have grown since the 1990s. In 2000, 100 million people were reported to suffer from high blood pressure and 26 million with diabetes. These figures were expected to double within a decade, with doctors warning that obesity could become China's biggest health threat for future generations.

Action and policy
Due to the current cultural views on obesity there is a significant need for anti-obesity education. Obesity is often associated with prosperity, thus there is a need for a widespread attitude shift to decrease the current rising rates. Perhaps resulting from the famines of generations past, food, specifically high-fat foods, are now seen as a luxurious item. With growing incomes in Chinese society, families are now able to afford these unhealthy but highly desired foods resulting in increasing rates of consumption of high-fat diets.  As a major contributor to the spread of obesity, these high-fat diets are creating a major public health problem across the country. There are currently a few initiatives in place that could help combat this problem, but because of its magnitude, it is likely that more improvements are needed.

The Chinese Nutrition Society is providing nutrition education by creating dietary guidelines to help consumers make more healthy lifestyle choices. These guidelines become useful in assisting the population in adopting healthy eating habits which can be an important preventative measure against obesity. Additionally, the Chinese government is currently mandating programs in schools to deal with the growing problem of obesity in the younger generations. "Eat Smart at School" is a campaign that was launched during the 2006–2007 school year, which aims to cultivate healthy eating practices to promote lifestyle changes in the educational setting. This program is also an important key in teaching healthy lifestyle strategies that can promote long-term changes in these children's lives.

Localizing community based interventions could help address the large, diverse population in China.  China is currently trying to utilize community based interventions through The National Plan of Action for Nutrition in China.  This demonstrates an extensive framework organizing food-based policies relating to the country's nutrition and health issues. Some of the policies work towards promoting healthy diets and lifestyles while also providing incentives to food growers.  Implementing nationwide social programs on public nutrition through mass media, public campaigns and community based promotions are potentially effective mediums towards combating obesity in China.

China's centralized government has a unique ability to make rapid policy changes where they can enforce public nutrition policy and regulate food supply.  The rapid growing market of fast food chains is a huge contributor to the increase in obesity rates in China.  Potentially, a price policy could be a strategic model for raising the price on “unhealthy” foods in an attempt to shift food consumption patterns to accomplish health objectives and reduce the consumption of high fat foods.  Through price policy, China can focus on controlling the external influence of international products on traditional Chinese dietary patterns and help manage the obesity trends and patterns due to the increase of Westernized foods and fast food chains.

See also

 Little Emperor Syndrome
 Epidemiology of obesity

References

Further reading
 Gao, Y., Griffiths, S., Chan, E. Y. Y. (2008). Community-based interventions to reduce overweight and obesity in China: a systematic review of the Chinese and English literature. J Public Health (Oxf) 30: 436-448
 Murugan, A., Sharma, G (2008). Obesity and respiratory diseases. Chronic Respiratory Disease 5: 233-242
 Linos, E., Spanos, D., Rosner, B. A., Linos, K., Hesketh, T., Qu, J. D., Gao, Y.-T., Zheng, W., Colditz, G. A. (2008). Effects of Reproductive and Demographic Changes on Breast Cancer Incidence in China: A Modeling Analysis. JNCI J Natl Cancer Inst 100: 1352-1360
 Lee, A., St Leger, L., Cheng, F. F. K., Hong Kong Healthy Schools Team, (2007). The status of health-promoting schools in Hong Kong and implications for further development. Health Promot Int 22: 316-326
 Tian, L., Shen, H., Lu, Q., Norman, R. J., Wang, J. (2007). Insulin Resistance Increases the Risk of Spontaneous Abortion after Assisted Reproduction Technology Treatment. J. Clin. Endocrinol. Metab. 92: 1430-1433
 James A. Levine (2008) Obesity in China: Causes and solutions  Chinese Medical Journal, 2008, Vol. 121 No. 11 : 1043-1050
 Sky Patterson (2011) "Obesity in China: Waistlines Expanding Twice as Fast as GDP", US-China Today.

External links
 China International Slimness and Fitness Association
 Chinese Weight Loss network

Health in China
China